The Bent Bridge or Curved Bridge is a stone arch bridge over the Kızılırmak River  southeast of the center of Sivas in Central Anatolia, Turkey. The bridge lies in the city's Kardeşler ward, on the road from Sivas to Malatya and onward to Syria and Mesopotamia.

Historian Thomas Alexander Sinclair says the bridge was originally built in medieval times, probably by the Seljuk Sultanate of Rum and extensively rebuilt in the late-Ottoman period.

Sinclair relates that one reason to build a bridge with a convex angle towards the river flow may have been to resist the pressure of ice in winter.

All the arches are pointed and most are the same width, except for three especially wide ones. The upstream piers all have stone cutwaters. The parapet has a thick moulding on the outside and is built with holes to allow water to flow off the roadway. Sinclair detects spolia (reused stonework) from the Classical and Anatolian Seljuk periods in the construction of the current bridge. He interprets this as likely to indicate that the original bridge was built by the Seljuks and included some material from an earlier building of the Classical era. The current bridge was then rebuilt using material from the Seljuk bridge. Assuming the bridge was constructed by the Seljuks, that would date it to a 69-year period between the conquest of Sivas by the Seljuk Sultan Kilij Arslan II in 1174, and the city's capture by the Ilkhanid Mongol commander Baiju, following the Battle of Köse Dağ on 26 June 1243.

The bridge is known to have been repaired in 1585 during the reign of Sultan Murad III. Halil Rifat Pasha was vali of Sivas from 1882 to 1885.

The Turkish Ministry of Culture and Tourism added the bridge to its national inventory of cultural heritage on 21 January 1983. It was restored by the 16th Region of the Highways Directorate in 2006, as a result of which the stone appears unusually pale and new.

References

Sources

Deck arch bridges
Seljuk bridges in Turkey
Ottoman bridges in Turkey
Buildings and structures in Sivas Province
Stone bridges in Turkey
Tourist attractions in Sivas Province
Arch bridges in Turkey
Bridges over the Kızılırmak